Dimitrios Pavlos Giannakopoulos (alternate spellings: Dimitris Giannacopoulos) (Greek: Δημήτρης Παύλος Γιαννακόπουλος) (born on June 22, 1974, Athens) is a Greek businessman and pharmaceutical manufacturer. He is the President of the Board and CEO of VIANEX, owner of Panathinaikos B.C. as well as owner of the 50% of the company SUPERFOODS SA, among many other activities.

Biographical information 
Dimitris Giannakopoulos was born in Athens. He is the only son of Pavlos Giannakopoulos’ founder of VIANEX, the largest Greek pharmaceutical company today.

On the side of his father, he is originally from Sellasia, Laconia.

In 2004, Dimitris Giannakopoulos became the first Vice President, and in January 2012 he became Deputy CEO of VIANEX. In 2019, he was appointed President of the BoD and CEO of VIANEX.

Business activity

VIANEX 
The involvement of the Giannakopoulos family in the field of pharmaceuticals started in 1924, in the pharmacy on Peiraios Street. The decisive step was made by Paul Giannakopoulos in 1960, with the establishment of the company FARMAGIAN, which in 1971 became an SA and was renamed into VIANEX SA. The manufacturing activity of the company started in 1977 with the creation of the first factory. By 1999, VIANEX had acquired four modern factories in Athens and Achaia while at Varympompi it had established its main offices and distribution centre of finished products. In 1995, the subsidiary VIAN SA was established, to distribute and market well-known over-the-counter products (OTCs), food supplements, as well as diagnostic and parapharmaceutical products.

The company employs 1242 people (as at 2020).

Dimitris Giannakopoulos took the reins of the company from his father Paul officially in January 2012 when he also became deputy CEO, in addition to being the Vice Chairman of the BoD of VIANEX.

The new era of the company under the leadership of Dimitris Giannakopoulos was associated with increased outreach and conclusion of important agreements, be them new ones or extension of existing ones. "I handed over the reins of the largest Greek pharmaceutical industry in the country and I'm sure that one day he will also make it the largest one abroad" stated Paul Giannakopoulos in July 2013, on the occasion of the announcement of the collaboration between VIANEX and Eli Lilly, for the production of the injectable antibiotic vancomycin at the facilities of VIANEX and its 100% export in the Chinese market.

The 2019 turnover of VIANEX Group was 301.3 million Euros.

SUPERFOODS 

In 2016 Giannakopoulos Group and Papazoglou Group acquired 50-50 of Superfoods, a Greek company of food supplements and natural health products.

References 

Living people
1974 births
Greek basketball chairmen and investors
Greek basketball executives and administrators
Greek businesspeople
Greek football chairmen and investors
Greek industrialists
Greek volleyball chairmen and investors
Panathinaikos B.C.
Panathinaikos B.C. presidents